Baby Action is the third studio album by the Japanese rock band Scandal, released in 2011. The album reached No. 4 on the Oricon chart and charted for 11 weeks.

Track listing

Personnel
HARUNA (Haruna Ono) - lead vocals, rhythm guitar
MAMI (Mami Sasazaki) - lead guitar, vocals
TOMOMI (Tomomi Ogawa) - bass, vocals
RINA (Rina Suzuki) - drums, vocals

Guest musicians
Sae - alto and tenor sax on track 6
Tomomi Sekiguchi - trumpet on track 6
r.u.ko - keyboards on track 7

References

2011 albums
Scandal (Japanese band) albums
Epic Records albums
Japanese-language albums